George Peter may refer to:
 George Peter (politician, born 1779) (1779–1861), US congressman from Maryland
 George Peter (politician, died 1893) (1829–1893), US Maryland politician, son of George Peter (1779–1861)
 George Peter (technician) (1922–2008), Cornell University technician

See also

George Peters (disambiguation)